The Xiyu Western Fort or Xiyu Western Battery ( Xīyǔ Xī Pàotái, informally  Xītái Gǔbǎo) is a former fort and battery in Wai'an Village, Xiyu Township, Penghu, Taiwan.

History
In the 17th century, Chinese Ming Dynasty loyalist general Chen Guoxuan built 15 batteries in Penghu to guard against Qing dynasty admiral Shi Lang. Many of the batteries were destroyed during the Sino-French War of 1884 and 1885, when Penghu was one of the main theaters of conflict. Following the war, Qing governor of Taiwan Liu Mingchuan built four batteries in Penghu in 1887, including the Xiyu Western Battery.  The battery was inscribed by Li Hongzhang.  Xiyu Western Fort was important in delaying Japanese attacks during the Japanese invasion of Taiwan in 1895 but was abandoned during Japanese rule.

It was designated a class-one historic relic in 1983 and, after a four-year renovation, was opened to the public in 1990. The Penghu County government purchased guns three British made Armstrong Guns for the fort in 2008 for NT$20 million and they were installed in 2011.

Architecture
The fort was constructed on basalt terrain and has the same height to the surrounding ground. It is fully surrounded by solid walls in all directions and has four cannons inside. There are many arches stretching to all directions.

See also
 List of tourist attractions in Taiwan

References

Forts in Penghu County
National monuments of Taiwan